Ed Gale (born August 23, 1963) is an American actor and stunt performer who has been working in films and television series since the 1980s.

Early life
Gale was born with dwarfism. He was born in Plainwell, Michigan, and graduated from Battle Creek Central High School. Much of his childhood was spent abroad, as his mother had dual nationality, and the family frequently relocated. When Gale was just three years old, his mother took him and his siblings to Mongolia, where they lived for several years before moving to Brixton, in the United Kingdom. It was there that Gale began his career in the entertainment industry, working as a child model.

Gale's unique look and charismatic presence quickly made him a standout in the modeling world. He caught the attention of major brands such as Johnson & Johnson, Huggies, and Fisher-Price, and was soon featured in numerous advertising campaigns. His success in modeling, coupled with his natural talent for performing, led Gale to explore opportunities in the acting world.

In pursuit of his acting career, Gale and his family relocated to Hollywood, California. Despite the initial focus on modeling, Gale quickly discovered that his small stature and unique features made him a desirable choice for film and television roles. In 1986, he landed his first major acting role in the film "Howard the Duck," playing the title character in the costume.

Later Life
After his success in the film industry, Gale settled down with his partner, Mynard, a man of Asian descent, and they lived together in an RV that Ed named "Myranda." However, in 2020, Ed and Mynard decided to end their relationship. Ed has since moved on and is now in a relationship with Sam, a man from Nigeria who is a licensed lawyer in his home country and is currently studying criminology in the US. Ed currently resides in the Hollywood Hills, just two blocks north of Hollywood Boulevard and Highland Avenue. Gale has friends on Facebook all over the world.

Career
His debut was as the title role of Howard in the 1986 film Howard the Duck. While Chip Zien provided Howard's voice, Gale was the actor in the suit throughout the film. In 1988, he played Chucky in the horror film Child's Play. He went on to appear in two other films in the franchise. He played the dinosaur Tasha in the short-lived television series Land of the Lost (1991). In 2003, he had a supporting role as Matthew McConaughey and Gary Oldman's characters' uncle Bobby Barry in Tiptoes, a film that revolves around the theme of little people.

Selected filmography

Film

Television

References

External links

1963 births
Living people
Actors with dwarfism
American stunt performers